Vice Chairman of China can refer to:
Vice Chairman of the Communist Party of China
Vice Chairman of the People's Republic of China
Vice Chairman of the Central Military Commission
Vice Chairman of the Standing Committee of the National People's Congress
Vice Chairperson of the Chinese People's Political Consultative Conference
Vice Chairman of the Central People's Government of the People's Republic of China
Vice Chairman of the National Government of the Republic of China